Vojka is a village in Vojvodina, Serbia, in the municipality of Stara Pazova.

Population

According to the 2011 census, the village had 4752 residents. 3837 people were adults, and the average age was 37.8 years (38.9 for women and 37.8 for men). The town consisted of 1425 households, and the average number of people per household was 3.52.

Origins
In ancient times, the city of Idiminium (IDIMINIVM) served as a Roman city and military base. First mentioned in 1416 but some say that it was founded before Stara Pazova. The name probably originates from the word for army (in Serbian: vojska), because an army was passing through the village, or the word for girl (in Serbian: devojka). Also there is legend of blind and beautiful girl who lived next to the lake. Her name was Vojka and she worked in the tavern. One day she went to clean her face next to the lake and when her eyes got wet she suddenly saw light.

See also
List of places in Serbia
List of cities, towns and villages in Vojvodina

References

Slobodan Ćurčić, Broj stanovnika Vojvodine, Novi Sad, 1996.

Populated places in Syrmia